The No.82 single-mandate constituency, shortened to OVO No.82 is one of 225 electoral districts that elects a member of parliament (people's deputy) to the Verkhovna Rada, Ukraine's national parliament.

Ukraine's electoral system is based on the mixed-member proportional representation system, which stipulates that half of a countries MPs are elected from proportional party lists, with the other half elected from first-past-the-post constituencies. A constituency's votes for a political bloc or party is tallied up with the rest of the 224 constituencies to determine the results of the proportional representation voting.

Location
The No.82 single-mandate constituency is located in the northern portion of Zaporizhzhia Oblast (province) in Ukraine, representing the Huliaipole Raion, Novomykolaivka Raion, part of Orikhiv Raion, Polohy Raion, Vilniansk Raion, Zaporizhzhia Raions (districts), including the cities of Huliaipole, Polohy, Vilniansk.

References

External links
 
 

Electoral districts of Ukraine
Zaporizhzhia Oblast
Constituencies established in 1998